Bernard Downing (August 14, 1869 in New York City – May 25, 1931 in Liberty, Sullivan County, New York) was an American politician from New York.

Life
He was the son of Charles Downing and Margaret Oakes Downing. He became an accountant.

Downing was a member of the New York State Senate from 1917 until his death in 1931, sitting in the 140th, 141st, 142nd, 143rd, 144th, 145th, 146th, 147th, 148th, 149th, 150th, 151st, 152nd, 153rd and 154th New York State Legislatures; and was Minority Leader from 1926 to 1931.

He died on May 25, 1931, at the Loomis Sanitarium in Liberty, New York, of intestinal tuberculosis; and was buried at the Calvary Cemetery in Queens.

Sources
 SENATOR DOWNING DIES AT 62 in NYT on May 26, 1931 (subscription required)

1869 births
1931 deaths
Democratic Party New York (state) state senators
People from Manhattan
20th-century deaths from tuberculosis
Burials at Calvary Cemetery (Queens)
Tuberculosis deaths in New York (state)